Legislative elections were held in El Salvador on 10 March 1968. The result was a victory for the National Conciliation Party, which won 27 of the 52 seats. Voter turnout was just 36.6%.

Results

References

Bibliography
Political Handbook of the world, 1968. New York, 1969. 
Benítez Manaut, Raúl. 1990. "El Salvador: un equilibrio imperfecto entre los votos y las botas." Secuencia 17:71-92 (mayo-agosto de 1990).
Caldera T., Hilda. 1983. Historia del Partido Demócrata Cristiano de El Salvador. Tegucigalpa: Instituto Centroamericano de Estudios Políticos.
Danby, Colin. The electoral farce ends, the war continues: the United States and the Salvadoran elections. Cambridge: CAMINO (Central America Information Office).
Eguizábal, Cristina. 1984. "El Salvador: elecciones sin democracia." Polemica (Costa Rica) 14/15:16-33 (marzo-junio 1984).
Herman, Edward S. and Frank Brodhead. 1984. Demonstration elections: U.S.-staged elections in the Dominican Republic, Vietnam, and El Salvador. Boston: South End Press.
Webre, Stephen. 1979. José Napoleón Duarte and the Christian Democratic Party in Salvadoran Politics 1960-1972. Baton Rouge: Louisiana State University Press.
Williams, Philip J. and Knut Walter. 1997. Militarization and demilitarization in El Salvador's transition to democracy. Pittsburgh: University of Pittsburgh Press.

El Salvador
Legislative elections in El Salvador
1968 in El Salvador